Gurban Jamal oghlu Sultanov (March 22, 1919 — September 30, 1998) was an Azerbaijani-Soviet statesman, Minister of Industrial Construction of the Azerbaijan SSR (1969–1972).

Biography 
Gurban Sultanov was born on March 22, 1919 in the city of Ganja. After graduating from high school, he studied at the Transcaucasian Institute of Railway Engineers in Tbilisi, where he graduated in 1941. He participated in the liberation of Rostov, Taganrog, Nikolaev, Brno, Bratislava, Prague and other cities during the Great Patriotic War of 1941-1945, was discharged from the army in October 1945 as a captain.

After returning from the war, Gurban Sultanov worked as a department head in the Azerbaijan Railway Trade Union Committee in 1946–1948, and as an instructor in the Baku Committee and the Central Committee of the Azerbaijan Communist Party. Later, he returned to production and held responsible positions in the "Azerdeniznefttikinti" system.

Gurban Sultanov, who worked as a manager in the construction organizations of Azerbaijan until 1961, was the Deputy Minister of Construction of Azerbaijan from 1962, the head of the trust No. 3 of the same ministry. Until 1969 he was the head of the Department of Installation and Special Construction of the Council of Ministers of the Azerbaijan SSR, in 1969-1972 he was the Minister of Industrial Construction of the Azerbaijan SSR. From May 1972, he was an engineer of the Azerbaijan Energy Enterprises Construction Trust. For a long time since 1974, he worked as the director of the Baku Slate Plant under the Ministry of Construction Materials Industry of the Azerbaijan SSR.

Gurban Sultanov was a member of the Central Committee of the Communist Party of Azerbaijan and was elected a deputy of the Supreme Soviet of the Azerbaijan SSR (7th-8th convocation). He died on September 30, 1998.

Awards 
 Order of the Red Banner of Labour — 1966
 Order of the Red Star
 Order of the Patriotic War (1st, 2nd degree)
 Honored Builder of the Azerbaijan SSR — 1964

References

External links 
 
 

1919 births
1998 deaths
Azerbaijan Communist Party (1920) politicians
Recipients of the Order of the Red Banner of Labour
Recipients of the Order of the Red Star